The blue chub (Gila coerulea) is a cyprinid fish found in the Klamath River and Lost River drainages of far northern California and southern Oregon.

Relatively slender among chubs, it has larger eyes than most and a terminal mouth that extends back nearly as far as the forward edge of the eye. Color is  a nondescript dusky shade on the back and silvery on the sides; the name comes from the males at breeding time, whose snout becomes noticeably blue, along with orange tinges on the sides and the fins. There are 9 rays in the dorsal fin, 8-9 in the anal fin, and 14-17 in each pectoral. Length ranges up to 41 cm.

Blue chubs have a varied diet, including both aquatic and terrestrial insects, crustaceans, and filamentous algae. They occur in a variety of habitats in their range; abundant in lakes, they are also found in streams and rivers. In Upper Klamath Lake, they generally prefer rocky margins and open water to marshy shores, while along Boles Creek, they are most abundant in shallow weedy reservoirs.

Spawning extends from May through August, typically over shallow gravelled areas, of depths of 0.5 meters or less. Each female is attended by two or more males, who agitate the water and thrust against her while she lays eggs in masses that adhere to shoreline rocks. (C. R. Hazel observed some males pushing females entirely out of the water in their excitement.)

Although not officially listed as a threatened species, and common within their range, Moyle says that there is cause for concern; the range is geographically limited, and the population dropped in the 1980s and 1990s, due to a combination of drought, pollution (agricultural runoff), and pressure from introduced fathead minnows.

References

 
 Peter B. Moyle, Inland Fishes of California (University of California Press, 2002), pp. 128–130

Chubs (fish)
Gila (fish)
Chub, Blue
Taxa named by Charles Frédéric Girard
Fish described in 1856